A list of films produced in Iran ordered by year of release in the 2000s. For an alphabetical list of Iranian films, see :Category:Iranian films

2000s

External links
 Iranian film at the Internet Movie Database

2000s
Iranian
Films